Trevisan (or Trévisan) is a Venetian surname, and may refer to:

 Bernard Trevisan (Bernard of Treviso, Bernardus Trevisanus; 1406–1490), Italian alchemist(s)
 Dalton Trevisan (born 1925), Brazilian author
 Ettore Trevisan, Italian football player and manager
 Eva Trevisan (born 1980), Italian softball player and Olympic competitor
 Iracema Trevisan Carneiro (born 1981), Brazilian musician and fashion designer
 João Silvério Trevisan (born 1944), Brazilian writer
 Luca Trevisan (born 1971), Italian professor of computer science at Stanford University
 Ludovico Trevisan (1401–1465), Venetian Catholic cardinal
 Martina Trevisan (born 1993), Italian tennis player
 Massimo Trevisan (born 1968), Italian swimmer and Olympic competitor
 Matteo Trevisan (born 1989), Italian tennis player
 Ruggero Trevisan (born 1990), Italian rugby player
 Stéphane Trévisan (born 1974), French footballer
 Trevor Trevisan (born 1983), Italian footballer
 Vittore Benedetto Antonio Trevisan de Saint-Léon (1818–1897), Italian botanist

See also
 Trevisani, a surname page
 Treviso, Italy, where the local dialect is known as Trevisan